Anderson de Carvalho Barbosa (born 1 September 1974), commonly known as Anderson Barbosa, is a Brazilian striker who currently plays at Sociedade Esportiva do Gama.

Club career
Anderson previously played Gama, Fluminense, Internacional and Criciúma in the Campeonato Brasileiro Série A. He also spent a season with the UAE Giants Al Wasl FC and was able to win the double with the club and get the top scorer trophy.
He is the only player who was top scorer for four years in a row in the UAE League. Anderson is the player with the highest number of goals of all time in the UAE, including foreigner and local player, summing up a total of 160 goals, of which 99 were scored in the UAE League.
Anderson has played in the UAE since 2003 when he was transferred to Sharjah Sports Club.

Club career statistics

Individual

Campeonato Brasiliense top scorer: 1994 (17 goals)
Campeonato Goiano top scorer: 1998 (20 goals) , 1999 (20 goals).
UAE President's Cup top scorer: 2005/2006 (8 goals).
UAE Pro League top scorer: 2004/2005 (23 goals) ,2005/2006 (20 goals) , 2006/2007 (18 goals) , 2007/2008 (16 goals).

References

1974 births
Living people
Brazilian footballers
Sociedade Esportiva do Gama players
Fluminense FC players
Criciúma Esporte Clube players
Sport Club Internacional players
Sharjah FC players
Al-Wasl F.C. players
Khor Fakkan Sports Club players
Al-Arabi SC (Qatar) players
Expatriate footballers in Qatar
Brazilian expatriate sportspeople in the United Arab Emirates
UAE Pro League players
UAE First Division League players
Qatar Stars League players
Association football forwards